Jaora Assembly constituency is one of the 230 Vidhan Sabha (Legislative Assembly) constituencies of Madhya Pradesh state in central India.

It is part of Ratlam District. There is a very famous holy place of Muslim community located here named "Hussain Tekri". The current MLA is Dr. Rajendra Pandey who is from BJP.

Members of the Legislative Assembly

See also
 Jaora

References

Assembly constituencies of Madhya Pradesh